The Inglewood Daily News was published in Inglewood, California, beginning around 1908 and ending in 1979 or after.

Founding and early days

The newspaper which preceded the Inglewood Daily News published its first edition as the Inglewood Star on April 21, 1888, from a newspaper office at the corner of Eucalyptus Street and Orchard Street (later named Redondo Boulevard and then Florence Avenue). The owner was Harry J. (or Henry G.) Shaw. There was no post office in Inglewood at that time, so the publication was entered as second-class mail (periodical literature) in Los Angeles.

In 1908, Hugh W. Hunt began publication of the Inglewood Poultryman in the community, which had a population of about a thousand and included forty families who owned poultry ranches there. The area was served by the Los Angeles and Redondo Railway.

Around 1901, the name of The Star was changed to Inglewood Times, under the editorship of Harold Beal. That publication was merged with the Inglewood Poultryman, and the name was changed to Inglewood News.

Sam M. Greene bought the weekly poultry journal and sold it to W.D. Crow and Thad N. Shaw of Washington State. They converted it into a daily newspaper in 1923. Crow then sold his interest to Thad Shaw and his son, Hubert Shaw.

In 1925, Shaw was the publisher. After his death, the News was owned by his widow, Mabel A. Shaw, and their son, Hubert H. Shaw.

The newspaper became a daily on January 1, 1926.

Other newspapers

Another newspaper business, the Inglewood Daily Californian, was owned by Donn Chamberlain and sold in 1928 to R.M. McCabe of the Highland Park News-Herald and C.L. Hunt, "lately from the East." Lloyd Hamilton was the city editor.
Another source stated that Paul V. Greene, at that time president of the Bank of Inglewood, purchased the six-day-a-week newspaper from Donn Chamberlain effective September 28, 1931. Greene at that time was the owner of a job printing plant in Hollywood.

Also published in Inglewood in 1932 were the Inglewood Californian, a semiweekly owned by California Assembly Member Sam M. Greene and Paul V. Greene, and the Inglewood Gazette, a weekly established about 1923 by Frank Fessler to serve the Inglewood Heights neighborhood.

Nylander controversy

Towne J. Nylander, regional director of the National Labor Relations Board was suspended from his job after an Inglewood Daily News article about one of his speeches was reprinted in the United States Congressional Record.

The News quoted him as saying that employers did not "have a chance" when they appeared before the NLRB. He later explained that he meant that the case against them was so carefully laid out that there was no doubt that they were guilty of any labor-relations complaint. He was chastised by officials in Washington but was reinstated.

Dean family ownership

The business was purchased by Edwin W. Dean, former Marengo, Illinois, editor and publisher, and Kenneth H. Kraft of Highland Park, Illinois, effective April 1, 1946. Dean took over active management of the business on June 17 after he and his family moved into their new home in Morningside Park. Kraft sold his interest in 1963.

The Dean family maintained ownership after the death of Edwin W. Dean on November 21, 1963.

Effective September 1, 1969, Edwin W. Dean Jr., publisher of the Inglewood Daily News, took over the Culver City Evening Star-News, Venice Vanguard and Westchester Star-News in a sale by the James S. Copley organization. The latter had purchased the Culver City and Venice newspapers in 1928 and had started the Westchester paper as a legal newspaper in 1967.

Union representation

In 1947 the International Typographical Union made an attempt to organize the mechanical workers of the newspaper. Pickets were at the building to demand a closed-shop contract. A strike was called, and about half of all employees refused to cross the picket line. Publisher Edwin A. Dean offered a contract hinging on the results of a National Labor Relations Board vote, but he was turned down. The newspaper already had a closed-shop contract with its stereotypers and pressmen.

Physical plant

In 1925, the newspaper, under Crow and Shaw, purchased a Cox-o-Type printing press, which was installed under the supervision of Joseph Cox, the designer. Later they bought a $25,000 Hoe press capable of printing 25,000 sixteen-page newspapers in an hour. It was dedicated in 1930 with an open house that attracted a thousand people.

The newspaper office was transformed into a modern style environment with a "face-lifting operation' in August 1937.

On May 13, 1973, the newspaper's building at 121 North LaBrea Avenue was almost leveled by fire, resulting in $100,000 in damages. A fireman was injured.

References

Daily newspapers published in California
Defunct newspapers published in California